William White, D.D. was an English academic  during the 16th-century:

White graduated MA from Balliol College, Oxford in 1505; BCL in 1515; and BD   in 1517. A priest, he was Vicar of St Lawrence Jewry in the City of London  from 1517. White was  Master of Balliol from 1525 to 1529.

Notes

16th-century English people
Alumni of Balliol College, Oxford
Masters of Balliol College, Oxford